Lomocyma is a monotypic moth genus in the family Sphingidae erected by Walter Rothschild and Karl Jordan in 1903. Its only species, Lomocyma oegrapha,  first described by Paul Mabille in 1884, lives in Madagascar.

References

Sphingini
Glossata genera
Taxa named by Walter Rothschild
Taxa named by Karl Jordan
Moths described in 1884
Moths of Madagascar
Monotypic moth genera